The Touch of Silk is a 1928 Australian play by Betty Roland about a French girl who marries a former Australian soldier after World War I.

It was produced around Australia and was adapted several times for radio. At one stage Katharine Cornell was reportedly interested in taking the play to Broadway.

The play was inspired by Roland's childhood.

References

External links
Production details at AusStage
"Playing the 20th century – episode two: The Touch of Silk", Radio National, 26 December 2010

Touch of Silk, The
1928 plays